Ben Sherrer (born June 18, 1968) is an American politician who served in the Oklahoma House of Representatives from the 8th district from 2004 to 2016.

References

1968 births
Living people
Democratic Party members of the Oklahoma House of Representatives